The Lotte Hotel Moscow is a 5 star hotel in Moscow situated at the intersection of New Arbat Avenue and Novinsky Boulevard.

Etymology
The Lotte Group got its name from “Charlotte”, the main character of Goethe’s masterpiece.

References

External links

 Official website

Hotels in Moscow
Hotels established in 2010
Hotel buildings completed in 2010
Arbat District